DBIT may refer to:

 Don Bosco Institute of Technology, Bangalore
 Don Bosco Institute of Technology, Mumbai
 Dev Bhoomi Institute of Technology, Dehradun